Chhoto Angaria massacre was a case of allegedly burning alive of 11 Trinamool Congress supporters on 4 January 2001 by alleged Communist Party of India (Marxist) (CPI(M)) workers in West Bengal state in India. The CBI found that the two CPI(M) leaders had been involved in the incident but failed to arrest them. The CBI had then filed chargesheets against the two but they were absconding. In the second week of November 2007, the two were arrested when they were leaving Nandigram.

References

Crime in West Bengal
Massacres in India
Massacres in 2001
Mass murder in 2001
2001 in India
2000s in West Bengal